The Louisiade flowerpecker (Dicaeum nitidum) is a species of bird in the family Dicaeidae.
It is found on Tagula, Misima and Rossel islands.

Its natural habitat is subtropical or tropical moist lowland forest.

References 

Dicaeum
Birds of the Louisiade Archipelago
Birds described in 1889
Taxa named by Henry Baker Tristram
Taxonomy articles created by Polbot